The mind projection fallacy is an informal fallacy first described by physicist and Bayesian philosopher E. T. Jaynes. In a first, "positive" form, it occurs when someone thinks that the way they see the world reflects the way the world really is, going as far as assuming the real existence of imagined objects. That is, someone's subjective judgments are "projected" to be inherent properties of an object, rather than being related to personal perception. One consequence is that others may be assumed to share the same perception, or that they are irrational or misinformed if they do not. In a second "negative" form of the fallacy, as described by Jaynes, occurs when someone assumes that their own lack of knowledge about a phenomenon (a fact about their state of mind) means that the phenomenon is not or cannot be understood (a fact about reality). (See also Map and territory.)

Jaynes used this concept to argue against Copenhagen interpretation of quantum mechanics. He described the fallacy as follows:

In the 18th century, David Hume suggested that the notion of causation comes from the mind, rather than from observation.  He noted that while, for example, we can observe the throwing of a brick and the subsequent breaking of a window, the notion that the brick "causes" the window to break is not empirical, since only conjunction of events in time, and not "causation," can be observed.

See also

References

1989 introductions
Informal fallacies